Gerard Leendert van Vliet (born 26 February 1964) is an Aruban former cyclist. He competed in the individual road race at the 1992 Summer Olympics.

References

External links
 

1964 births
Living people
Aruban male cyclists
Olympic cyclists of Aruba
Cyclists at the 1992 Summer Olympics
Place of birth missing (living people)